Victoria—Carleton was a federal electoral district in New Brunswick, Canada, that was represented in the House of Commons of Canada from 1917 to 1968.

This riding was created in 1914 from Carleton and Victoria ridings. It was first used in the Canadian federal election of 1917. It was abolished in 1966 when it was redistributed into Carleton—Charlotte and Madawaska—Victoria ridings.

Members of Parliament

This riding elected the following members of the House of Commons of Canada:

Election results

See also 

 List of Canadian federal electoral districts
 Past Canadian electoral districts

External links 
 Riding history from the Library of Parliament
 Website of the Parliament of Canada

Former federal electoral districts of New Brunswick